Apocalypse Now is a 1979 American epic war film.

Apocalypse Now may also refer to:
Apocalypse Now (album), a 1999 album by Pere Ubu
Apocalypse Now (painting), a 1988 painting by Christopher Wool